Sainkho Namtchylak (born 1957) is a singer originally from Tuva, an autonomous republic in the Russian Federation just north of Mongolia. She is known for her Tuvan throat singing or Khöömei.

Style
Namtchylak is an experimental singer, born in 1957 in a secluded village in the south of Tuva. She is proficient in overtone singing; her music encompasses avant-jazz, electronica, modern composition and Tuvan influences. In Tuva, numerous cultural influences collide: the Turkic roots and culture it shares with Central Asian states, the Xinjiang Uyghur Autonomous Region, Bashkortostan and Tatarstan; the strong Mongolic cultural influence and traditions it shares with Mongolia, Inner Mongolia, Buryatia and Kalmykia; the cultural influences from the various Siberian nomadic ethnic groups such as Samoyeds, Yeniseians, Evenks and from the Russian Old Believers, the migrant and resettled populations from Ukraine, Tatarstan and other minority groups west of the Urals. All of these, to extents, impact on Namtchylak's voice, although the Siberian influences dominate: her thesis produced while studying voice, first at the University of Kyzyl, then in the Gnesins Institute in Moscow during the 1980s focussed on Lamaistic and cult musics of minority groups across Siberia, and her music frequently shows tendencies towards Tungus-style imitative singing.

Being the daughter of a pair of schoolteachers, she grew up in an isolated village on the Tuvan/Mongolian border, exposed to the local overtone singing – something that was generally reserved for the males; in fact, females were actively discouraged from learning it (even now, the best-known practitioners remain male, artists like Huun-Huur-Tu and Yat-Kha). However, she learned much of her traditional repertoire from her grandmother, and went on to study music at the local college, but she was denied professional qualifications. Quietly she studied the overtone singing, as well as the shamanic traditions of the region, before leaving for study further in Moscow (Tuva was, at that time, part of the U.S.S.R.). Her degree completed, she returned to Tuva where she became a member of Sayani, the Tuvan state folk ensemble, before abandoning it to return to Moscow and joining the experimental Tri-O, where her vocal talents and sense of melodic and harmonic adventure could wander freely. That first brought her to the West in 1990, although her first recorded exposure came with the Crammed Discs compilation Out of Tuva. Once the Soviet Union had collapsed, she moved to Vienna, making it her base, although she traveled widely, working in any number of shifting groups and recording a number of discs that revolved around free improvisation – not unlike Yoko Ono – as well as performing around the globe. It was definitely fringe music, although Namtchylak established herself very firmly as a fixture on that fringe. In 1997 she was the victim of an attack that left her in a coma for several weeks. Initially she thought it was some divine retribution for her creative hubris, and seemed to step back when she recorded 1998's Naked Spirit, which had new age leanings. However, by 2000 she seemed to have overcome that block, releasing Stepmother City, her most accessible work to date, where she seemed to really find her stride, mixing traditional Tuvan instruments and singing with turntables and effects, placing her in a creative firmament between Yoko and Björk, but with the je ne sais quoi of Mongolia as part of the bargain. A showcase at the WOMEX Festival in Berlin brought her to the attention of many, and in 2001 a U.S. tour was planned.

Career
After graduating, Namtchylak worked with several ensembles: the Moscow State Orchestra; the Moscow-based jazz ensemble Tri-O (since 1989); School of Dramatic Art under the direction of Anatoly Vasiliev (Moscow), various orchestras in Kyzyl,  the Tuvan 'folkloric orchestra'—a far less sanitised example of folk baroque than, say, existed in pre-independence Kazakhstan—that has housed many of Tuva's other important singers. However, for several years Namtchylak annually invited foreign musicians to Tuva to promote Tuvan culture.

Based in Vienna, Namtchylak sculpted Stepmother City to reflect her ambivalent feelings about European metropolis. Calling herself "first and foremost a woman from the Steppes," Namtchylak's first musical inspiration came from her nomadic grandmother, who would sing lullabies for hours. She grew up in a culture where people just sing when they feel like it—singing when they’re happy and singing when they’re sad. Denied professional credentials from a local college where her explorative nature led her toward forbidden male-dominated overtone singing styles, Namtchylak transferred to Moscow where she discovered Russian improvisation and where she also continue to study about vocal techniques of Siberian lamaistic and shamanistic traditions.

Audiences are astounded by the diversity of sounds Namtchylak can produce with her voice, from operatic soprano to birdlike squawks, from childlike pleas to soulful crooning; which at various moments elicit comparisons to Zap Mama, Patti Smith, Billie Holiday, and Nina Hagen. In 1997, Namtchylak was horrifically attacked by Tuvinian racketeers which left her in a coma for two weeks. Again, sources regarding this contradict – others maintain that she underwent surgery for a severe malignant brain tumor; regardless, 1997 marked an appreciable change in her life. Since then, she has been resident in exile in Vienna, and has also recorded more prolifically as a solo artist – although she has released over thirty albums in the past twenty years, only seven have been entirely solo.

Namtchylak claims that music and spirituality are related by desire, or the tension that yells to reawaken people. Eager to take part in the process of remembering what has been forgotten, Stepmother City presents itself like a map, proposing routes to connect Western physicality with Eastern spirituality.

In 2005, the Italian publishing house Libero di Scrivere released a book of poetry Karmaland. In 2006 in Saint Petersburg, a book Chelo-Vek (a play on words in Russian, conflating "chelovek" meaning "person" and, though the hyphen, obsoletism "chelo" meaning "front" or "forehead" and "vek" meaning "age" or "eon" or "century", into something like "front-eon") was published in Russian, Tuvinian and in English.

in 2016, she released "like a bird or spirit, not a face", an album produced by Grammy-winner Ian Brennan (music producer, author) and featuring members of Tinariwen.

Discography

Albums
 Transformation of Matter, DOCUMENT, vol. V 1990, with TRI-O, Leo Records London UK
 Tunguska-guska, 1991, Eine Meteoriten-Oper, EFA-Schneeball Germany
 Lost Rivers, 1991, FMP Germany
 When the sun is out..., 1991, FMP-Berlin Germany
 Octet-Ost, 1991, with Christian Muthspiel, Amadeo Austria
 Marsias Song, 1992, with Mattias Ziegler and Mark Dresser, Zürich Switzerland
 Pulse, 1992, with Michael Sievert, Dizzy Essentials Germany (Helmut Diez)
 Live, 1993, with Kang Tae Hwan, Free Improvisation Network Record Japan
 Out Of Tuva, 1993, Crammed World Belgium
 Expos Jazz & Joy, 1993, Ver Abra records Germany
 Mixing it, 1993, Chill out Label London UK
 Synergetics Phonomanie III, 1993, Leo Records LR
 Live at City Garden, 1994, with Moscow Composers Orchestra, U-Sound
 The First Take, 1994, with Biosintes, FMP 80 Berlin Germany
 Dancing on the Island, 1994, with Irene Becker
 Techno mit Störungen, 1995, Plag Dich Nicht
 Mars song, 1996, with Evan Parker, Victo Canada
 Amulet, 1996, with Ned Rothenberg, Leo records London UK
 An Italian Love Affair, 1996, with Moscow Composers Orchestra, Leo Records London UK
 The Gift, 1996, with Moscow Composers Orchestra, Long Arms Records Russia
 Let Peremsky Dream, 1997, with Moscow Composers Orchestra, Leo Records London UK
 Time Out, 1997, Ponderosa, Italy
 Naked Spirit, 1998, Amiata Records
 Kharms-10 Incidents, 1998, Long Arms Records Russia
 Voci in Viagio, 1999, Amiata UNITA Italy
 Temenos, 1999, Leo Records London UK
 Homo Sonorus – International Anthology of Sound Poetry, 2001, poetry compilation, vol IV Russia
 El Lebrijano – Lagrimas de Cera, 2001, EMI International
 Stepmother City 2001, Ponderosa
2001 – Aurasolo Sainkho. duo-Peter Kowald & Sainkho, trio-Sainkho & Vl. Volkov, Vl. Tarasov, Ponderosa, Italy
2002 – "Golden Years of the Soviet New Jazz" vol 3,4 GY 409/412): Namtchylak with Pop-Mechanika 18 November 1989, Namtchylak with Mikchail Zukov 10 June 1990, Namtchylak + Tri-O 1989, 1991, Namtchylak with Sergey Letov 11 June 1989, 1991
2003 – Who Stole The Sky, Ponderosa, Italy
2005 – Arzhaana, a musical fairy tale, Asia Plus Records, Russia
2005 – Forgotten streets of St.Petersburg, Tri-O & Namtchylak, Leo Records, London
2005 – "Karmaland" Live CD add to the book "Karmaland" by LiberoDiscrivere, Italy
2007 – "Tuva-Irish live music project" electronics with Roy Carroll – Leo Records, London
2007 – "Nomad" – compilation of best works by Namtchylak, dedicated to 50 universary – Leo Records
2008 – "Intrance" acoustic duo with Jarrod Gagwin – Leo Records, London
2008 – "Mother-Earth! Father-Sky!" Huunhuurtu ft. Namtchylak, Jaro Records, Germany, jaro 4281-2
2009 – "Portrait of an Idealist" Moscow Composer Orchestra ft. Namtchylak – Leo Records, London
2009 – "Tea Opera" electronics with Dickson Dee – Leo Records, London
2010 – "Not quite songs" electro acoustic with Nick Sudnik – Leo Records, London
2010 – "Terra" jazz arranged songs with Wolfgang Puschnig, Paul Urbanek – Leo Records, London
2010 – "Cyberia" solo voice – Ponderosa Music and Art, Italy
2010 – "Simply-Live" compilation of live recordings of son program, Tree Music, China
2013 – "Go To Tuva": Sainkho & Garlo, BP12 
2015 – "Like A Bird Or Spirit, Not A Face", Ponderosa Music & Art
2020 – "Earth" with Minim – KOLD, Poland
2021 – "Manifesto" with Minim – KOLD, Poland

Compilations
1993 – Letters, live recordings, released 1993 by Leo Records London UK
1994 – ''The Rough Guide to World Music, World Music Network

References

External links
Her website
FMP releases
Sainkho Namtchylak at Avantart
http://bp12.fr/catalog/tuva/
http://ponderosa.it/en/label/3/like-a-bird-or-spirit-not-a-face

1957 births
Living people
People from Ulug-Khemsky District
Russian women singers
Tuvan musicians
Leo Records artists
FMP/Free Music Production artists